Lisa Teresia Regnell (later Lindh, 3 February 1887 – 5 November 1979) was a Swedish diver who won the silver medal in the 10 m platform event at the 1912 Olympics. Her younger sister Elsa finished fourth in the same competition, while her elder brother Nils was an Olympic swimmer.

Regnell graduated as organist from a musical academy, and was the first female member of the Swedish Swimming Federation, in 1914–20. She was married to Sam Lindh, who was the treasurer of the same federation in 1918–32.

References

1887 births
1979 deaths
Swedish female divers
Divers at the 1912 Summer Olympics
Olympic divers of Sweden
Olympic silver medalists for Sweden
Olympic medalists in diving
Medalists at the 1912 Summer Olympics
Stockholms KK divers
Divers from Stockholm
19th-century Swedish women
20th-century Swedish women